Robert Walcott (24 January 1910 – 23 August 1988) was an American historian specializing in early 18th-century English politics.

Augustan politics

Walcott subjected early 18th-century English politics to a Namierite analysis, arguing that it was dominated by various factions based on sectional and familial interests. He challenged the traditional view, espoused by G. M. Trevelyan and Sir Keith Feiling, that the politics of Queen Anne's reign was dominated by two parties (Whigs and Tories).

However Walcott's thesis came under increasing criticism. G. V. Bennett claimed that Walcott's book-length argument was "disastrous":

[Walcott's] methodology was patently at fault. Having created a card-index of biographical material for individual M.P.s, he attempted on this basis to allot them to the different political groups of his own theory. One connection, the 'Newcastle-Pelham-Walpole' faction, clearly had no existence at all, as any acquaintance with known political correspondence would reveal. Other groups were inflated by the inclusion of men whose relationship with the leading political figure was of the flimsiest nature. Walcott had relied to an extreme degree on a specialized professional technique, and his work ignored not only the literature of the time but the great mass of political papers which were already available when he wrote.

In 1967 Walcott's thesis was superseded by Geoffrey Holmes' view that Anne's reign was indeed dominated by two parties. In 1992 Tim Harris claimed that Walcott's thesis was "now totally discredited".

Works

'English Party Politics, 1688-1714' in Essays in Modern English History in Honor of W. C. Abbott (Harvard, 1941).
English Politics in the Early Eighteenth Century (Oxford: Oxford University Press, 1956).

References

1910 births
1988 deaths
Historians of England
20th-century American historians
American male non-fiction writers
People from Massachusetts
20th-century American male writers